Gregor Betz (born 21 November 1948) is a German former swimmer. He competed at the 1968 Summer Olympics and the 1972 Summer Olympics.

References

External links
 

1948 births
Living people
German male swimmers
Olympic swimmers of West Germany
Swimmers at the 1968 Summer Olympics
Swimmers at the 1972 Summer Olympics
People from Garmisch-Partenkirchen (district)
Sportspeople from Upper Bavaria